Teniz is a lake in Kamysty District, Kostanay Region, Kazakhstan.

Teniz is part of the Tounsor State Nature Reserve, a  protected area under the Naurzum Nature Reserve.

Geography
Teniz lies in the basin of the Tobol, east of the Russian border. It is an endorheic lake located in a depression between lakes Kulykol/Taldykol to the west and Urkash to the east.

River Karasu flows into the western side of the lake from the north.

Flora and fauna
Teniz is an important stopover of bird migratory routes. However, since the 1980s to 1990s part of the birds, such as the red-breasted geese moved to the Kulykol lake. Currently the most important concentrations are made up of blue ducks, crested ducks, mallards and Eurasian teals, as well as coots.

See also
Central Asian Flyway
List of lakes of Kazakhstan

References

External links
Атлас ключевых территорий для стерха и других околоводных птиц Западной и Центральной Азии

Lakes of Kazakhstan
Endorheic lakes of Asia
Kostanay Region